This is a supplementary data page for trichlorofluoromethane.

References

Chemical data pages
Chemical data pages cleanup